The 2005 Molson Indy Montreal was the tenth round of the 2005 Champ Car season, held on August 28, 2005 at Circuit Gilles Villeneuve in Montreal, Quebec, Canada.  Sébastien Bourdais was the polesitter and Oriol Servià won the race.  It was Servià's first victory in major American open wheel competition and remains his only win.

Qualifying results

Race

Caution flags

Notes

 New Race Record Oriol Servià 1:59:10.516
 Average Speed 107.746 mph

Championship standings after the race

Drivers' Championship standings

 Note: Only the top five positions are included.

References

External links
 Friday Qualifying Results
 Saturday Qualifying Results
 Race Results

Montreal
Molson
Grand Prix of Montreal
2005 in Quebec